Ibrahim Yahaya Oloriegbe is a Nigerian medical doctor, politician and philanthropist. Oloriegbe graduated with MBBS degree from Ahmadu Bello University, Zaria, 
Nigeria in 1985. He attended training programmes in 
Change Management, Advocacy, Facilitation Skills, Project Management, Health 
policy and systems analysis, Legislation, Leadership and an Executive 
Programme on Coaching and Consulting for Change at the Oxford University U.K

As a politician, he was the majority leader at the Kwara State House of Assembly between 1999 – 2003. He contested in the 2011 general election, in which he lost to Sen. Bukola Saraki. In 2019, he contested for the Kwara Central Senatorial District seat which he won against the incumbent Senate president of Nigeria. Sen. Bukola Saraki.

Early life, education and career

Oloriegbe was born on 12 November 1960. He 
graduated from Ahmadu Bello University, Zaria in 1985 with Bachelor of 
Medicine, Bachelor of Surgery Degree (MB.BS). He had distinctions in Human 
Physiology, Biochemistry, Community Medicine and Laboratory Medicine.
He had further training in Health System Analysis, Change Management and 
Health Services Management. He completed a Master of Science in Consulting 
and Coaching for Change, (an executive programme jointly run by University of 
Oxford, U.K and HEC Business School, Paris) in October 2006.
Oloriegbe had practiced as a clinician in the Nigeria Health Sector since 1985. He 
had worked in both public and private sectors. He had among others been the 
medical director of Al-barka Hospital in Kano and Oloriegbe Clinic & Maternity 
Hospital, Ilorin. He had been in the leadership of the Nigerian Medical 
Association (NMA), Association of General and Private Medical Practitioners of 
Nigeria (AGPMPN) and Guild of Medical Directors (GMD). He was the secretary 
general of NMA in Kano (1991–1994), during which he was a member of the 
National Executive Council of NMA. He was also the Secretary of Kano AGPMPN 
and GMD between 1992 and 1994.

Family
Oloriegbe is married with 4 children.

Political career

Oloriegbe contested and was elected a member of the Kwara house of assembly under the All Nigeria Peoples Party (ANPP). He was also the majority leader, Chairman House Committee on Health and House Committee on Local Government from 1999-2003. He was a member of the Action Congress of Nigeria (ACN) and also contested for the Kwara Central's Senatorial Election under the party against Bukola Saraki in 2011, who was then Governor of Kwara State.

In the February 23, 2019 Kwara Central Senatorial district election, He was elected Senator for Kwara Central senatorial District defeating the Incumbent Bukola Saraki.

In 2022, Oloriegbe lost his bid to return to the Senate when he lost the primary election for Kwara Central in the All Progressive Congress (APC) primaries in Kwara State to Saliu Mustapha

Awards and honours
 HONORARY CITIZEN, GEORGIA STATE, U.S.A- 2003 
 BEST STUDENT PRICES IN PHYSICS, CHEMISTRY, BIOLOGY MATHEMATICS, ECONOMICS AND GEOGRAPHY IN A.I.S.S ILORIN-1979

References 

Year of birth missing (living people)
Living people
Politicians from Kwara State
Members of the Senate (Nigeria) from Kwara State
Ahmadu Bello University alumni